"Lao' a Lao'" is a song by American singer Prince Royce. The song was released on August 12, 2021.  The music video premiered on the same day as its audio release.  An alternate version which is called in the title as Bachata 2.0 was released on December 17, 2021.

Charts

Weekly charts

Year-end charts

Certifications

See also
List of Billboard Hot Latin Songs and Latin Airplay number ones of 2021
List of Billboard Tropical Airplay number ones of 2021

References

2021 songs
2021 singles
Prince Royce songs
Sony Music Latin singles
Songs written by Prince Royce
Spanish-language songs